Retalick may refer to:

Richard Retalick ( (died 1803), British naval officer
, British frigate which served in the Royal Navy from 1943 to 1945